The Vaillant was a French automobile built in Lyon from 1922 to 1924.  It was a cyclecar which used a Chapuis-Dornier engine of either 961 cc or 1350 cc.

References
David Burgess Wise, The New Illustrated Encyclopedia of Automobiles.

Cyclecars
Defunct motor vehicle manufacturers of France